Wesley Spieringhs (born 16 January 2002) is a Dutch professional footballer who plays as a midfielder for Eerste Divisie club Willem II.

Career
Spieringhs was born Goirle, North Brabant and began his football career with local club VOAB. In 2012 he moved to the youth academy of Willem II , where he progressed through all youth teams. In the 2019–20 season he made his first appearances in the Beloften Eredivisie for the reserves, before becoming part of the first team competing in the Eredivisie for the 2020–21 season. 

He made his professional debut on 12 September 2020, the first matchday of the domestic season, in a 2–0 defeat against SC Heerenveen when he came off the bench for Dries Saddiki in the 87th minute. On 12 December, he was in the starting eleven of the Tilburg-based team for the first time in a 5–3 defeat against AZ. In the second half of the season, Spieringhs more regularly appeared in central midfield, finishing the season with 22 appearances.

At the beginning of the 2021–22 season he was mostly a substitute for Willem II, but managed to score his first professional goal on 22 August 2021 in a 3–0 win against Vitesse. After coming on as a substitute for Ché Nunnely in the 82nd minute, he scored just seconds later, heading home a cross by Max Svensson to cement the final score. In September 2021, he suffered a knee injury with tests confirming that he tore his meniscus. After surgery, he was sidelined for six months, only returning to the squad in April 2022. On 1 May, he made his first appearance after coming back from injury, coming off the bench in the 76th minute in a 4–2 loss to PSV.

Career statistics

References

External links
 
 
 

2002 births
Living people
Dutch footballers
Association football midfielders
Willem II (football club) players
Eredivisie players
People from Goirle
Footballers from North Brabant